Jordan A. Harris is Democratic member of the Pennsylvania House of Representatives, representing the 186th legislative district. He was elected in 2013. Rep. Harris has been elected the chairman of the Pennsylvania Legislative Black Caucus for the 2017-2018 legislative session.

Harris holds a bachelor's degree in governmental and political affairs from Millersville University and a master's degree in education from Cabrini College. He is enrolled in a doctoral program at Neumann University. Harris is a former teacher in the Philadelphia Public Schools. He has served in city government, rising to the position of director of the Philadelphia Youth Commission.

Harris helped pass legislation that will allow for criminal record expungement in certain situations. Harris worked on this legislation since he was sworn into office, and Governor Tom Wolf  signed the bill into law in early 2016.

Harris is a member of the Knight Foundation's Philadelphia Community Advisory Committee.

Harris was selected by the Pennsylvania Democratic Party as one of 20 delegates to the United States Electoral College for Joe Biden and his running mate, Kamala Harris, in the 2020 United States presidential election.

References

External links
Biography at pahouse.com

1984 births
2020 United States presidential electors
20th-century African-American people
21st-century African-American politicians
21st-century American politicians
African-American state legislators in Pennsylvania
Cabrini University alumni
Democratic Party members of the Pennsylvania House of Representatives
Living people
Millersville University of Pennsylvania alumni
Neumann University alumni
Politicians from Philadelphia
Schoolteachers from Pennsylvania